Ed Bennett (December 20, 1937 – January 7, 2018) was an American sailor. He competed in the Finn event at the 1972 Summer Olympics.

References

External links
 

1937 births
2018 deaths
American male sailors (sport)
Olympic sailors of the United States
Sailors at the 1972 Summer Olympics – Finn
Sportspeople from Oakland, California